Lüboyuan railway station is a railway station on the Zhengzhou–Kaifeng intercity railway. The station is 2 km north of the Green Expo Garden in Zhongmu County, Zhengzhou, Henan, China.

History
The station was opened on 28 December 2014, together with the railway.

On 10 January 2016, after the closure of Jialuhe station and Yunlianghe station, the station became the only operational intermediate station of the Zhengzhou–Kaifeng intercity railway.

Station layout
The station is an elevated train station. The ground level is for ticket offices and waiting rooms and platforms and tracks are on the second floor. The station has two side platforms and four tracks. The two tracks in the middle are through tracks for non-stop trains. The northern platform is for trains towards  and the southern platform is for trains towards .

References

Railway stations in Zhengzhou
Stations on the Zhengzhou–Kaifeng Intercity Railway
Railway stations in China opened in 2014